The Oscar Carré Trophy is a circus award in Netherlands and is named after the Royal Netherland Cirque circus operator Oscar Carré. Most of the time it is based upon the complete oeuvre of the circus.

Winners of the Oscar Carré Trophy
1993: Flavio Togni
1995: Herman Renz
2000: Louis Knie Senior of Circus Knie
2004: Martin Hanson

Other winners:
 Gert Siemonet Barum
 Luciën & Arlette Gruss

References

Dutch awards
Circuses